Regan is a ghost town, a historical mining town, and a former populated place in White Pine County, Nevada. It had its own Regan post office from August 1906 to November 1907.

References 

Ghost towns in White Pine County, Nevada
Ghost towns in Nevada